Jabalia also Jabalya is a Palestinian city located  north of Gaza City. It is under the jurisdiction of the North Gaza Governorate, in the Gaza Strip. According to the Palestinian Central Bureau of Statistics, Jabalia had a population of 82,877 in mid-2006. The Jabalia refugee camp is adjacent to the city to the north. The nearby town of Nazla is a part of the Jabalia municipality. The city is currently ruled by a Hamas administration.

Archaeology
A large cemetery dating to the 8th century CE was found near Jabalia. The workmanship indicates that the Christian community in Gaza was still very much in existence in the early Islamic era of rule in Palestine, and capable of artistic achievements. The remains of the pavement spared by the iconoclasts show depictions of wild game, birds, and country scenes. The late dating of the mosaic pavement proves that the intervention of the iconoclasts, after 750, is later than previously thought and is associated with Abbasid conservatives.

While working on the Salah al-Din Road, laborers accidentally uncovered a monastery from the Byzantine period. The site was excavated by the Palestinian Department of Antiquities. Now the stunning Byzantine mosaics of the monastery are covered with sand to shield them from erosion caused by the direct impact of the winter rain. Byzantine ceramics have also been found.

In 2022, restoration of a fifth century Byzantine church carried out by French organisation Premiere Urgence Internationale and the British Council has been finished. The church is decorated with mosaics and religious texts written in Greek.

History
Jabalia was known for its fertile soil and citrus trees. The Mamluk Governor of Gaza Sanjar al-Jawli ruled the area in the early 14th-century and endowed part of Jabalia's land to the al-Shamah Mosque he built in Gaza.

Until 2014, Jabalia also had the ancient Omari Mosque. The site was believed to have housed a mosque since the seventh century, and its portico and minaret dated back to the 14th century, but the Omari was destroyed by Israeli bombings in 2014. The portico consists of three arcades supported by four stone columns. The arcades have pointed arches and the portico is covered by crossing vaults.

Ottoman period
Incorporated into the Ottoman Empire in 1517 with all of Palestine,  Jabalia  appeared   in the  1596 tax registers  as being in the Nahiya of  Gaza of the Liwa of Gazza. It had a population of 331 households, all Muslim, who  paid taxes on wheat, barley, vine yards and fruit trees; a total of 37,640 akçe. 2/3 of the revenue went to a waqf.

In 1838, Edward Robinson   noted Jebalia as a Muslim village, located in the Gaza district.

In 1863, the French  explorer Victor Guérin  found in the mosque fragments of old constructions, and at the  well some broken columns.  An Ottoman  village list from about 1870  found that the village had  a population of 828, in a total of  254  houses, though the population count included men, only.

In the Palestine Exploration Fund's  1883 Survey of Western Palestine, Jabalia was described as being a large adobe village, with gardens and a well on the north-west. It had a mosque named Jamia Abu Berjas.

British Mandate era
In the 1922 census of Palestine conducted by the British Mandate authorities, Jabalia had a population of 1,775 inhabitants, all Muslim, increasing in the 1931 census to 2,425, still all Muslims, in 631 houses.

In the  1945 statistics, Jabalia had a population of 3,520, all Muslims,  with 11,497  dunams of land, according to an official land and population survey. Of this, 138 dunams were for citrus and bananas, 1,009 for plantations and irrigable land, 1,036 for cereals, while 101  dunams were built-up   land.

Post-1948

During the early months of First Intifada on 27 March 1989 Fares S'aid Falcha, aged 50, was beaten by Israeli soldiers. He died 3 weeks later in the Makassed Hospital. A report was compiled by the Military Police Investigators and details passed on to the Chief Military Prosecutor.

In late 2006, Jabalia was the scene of mass protests against airstrikes on militants' homes. Israel contacted the residences of several Hamas members who launched missiles at Israeli civilians from the houses, warning them of an airstrike within the next 30 minutes. Neighbors responded by forming a human shield and successfully stalled the demolition. In 2021, seven people were killed by a Hamas rocket.

Demographics
Jabalia has an above-average rate of male pseudohermaphrodite births. Jehad Abudaia, a Canadian-Palestinian pediatrician and urologist, has suggested that consanguinity due to cousin marriages accounts for the prevalence of pseudohermaphrodite births. In the Gaza Strip, pseudohermaphrodite conditions often go undetected for years after birth due to the region's lower standards of medical treatment and diagnostics.

Twin towns – sister cities

Jabalia is twinned with:
 Ümraniye, Turkey

References

Bibliography

External links

UNRWA Jabalia
Welcome To The City of Jabaliya
Survey of Western Palestine, Map 19:   IAA, Wikimedia commons

Cities in the Gaza Strip
Municipalities of the State of Palestine
North Gaza Governorate